Sharla is an English feminine given name that is a feminine form of Charles. Notable people with the name include:

Given name
Sharla Boehm (born 1929), American computer scientist  
Sharla Cheung (born 1967), Hong Kong actress and film producer
Sharla Hinskens (born 1986), also known as Sharmeleon and Sharla in Japan, Canadian YouTuber based in Japan
Sharla Martiza (born 2003), Indonesian singer
Sharla Passariello (born 1992), Welsh footballer
Sharla Thomas (born 2010), One of the oldest rabbits in the UK

See also

Charla (name)
Kharla Chávez
Sharly Mabussi
Shabla (disambiguation)
Shala (surname)
Shapla (disambiguation)
Shara (name)
Sharda (disambiguation)
Sharga (disambiguation)
Sharma (disambiguation)
Shayla (disambiguation)

Notes

English feminine given names